Acton Round is a village and civil parish in the English county of Shropshire. Acton Round was recorded in the Domesday Book as Achetune. The civil parish includes the village of Muckley.

See also
Listed buildings in Acton Round

References

External links
 
 

Villages in Shropshire
Civil parishes in Shropshire